Marco Asensio Willemsen (born 21 January 1996) is a Spanish professional footballer who plays as a winger and attacking midfielder for La Liga club Real Madrid and the Spain national team.

After starting out at Mallorca, Asensio signed with Real Madrid in November 2014, being consecutively loaned to his former club as well as Espanyol. Upon his return, he has gone on to win several honours, including three Champions League and three La Liga trophies.

Asensio made his senior debut for Spain in 2016, representing them at the 2018 and 2022 FIFA World Cup.

Early life
Born in Palma, Majorca, Balearic Islands to a Dutch mother and a Spanish father, Asensio joined RCD Mallorca in 2006 from CF Platges de Calvià. His mother, Maria Willemsen, died of cancer when he was 15.

Asensio struggled with growth deficiencies in his knees during his youth, which only subsided when he was a teenager.

Club career

Mallorca
After being scouted by Real Madrid and FC Barcelona, Asensio made his senior debut with Mallorca's reserves in the 2013–14 season in the Tercera División, despite still being a junior; he made his first competitive appearance for the first team on 27 October 2013, playing the last six minutes in a 1–3 away loss against Recreativo de Huelva in the Segunda División.

Again from the bench, Asensio played the last six minutes in a 0–0 home draw against CD Lugo. After impressing in his first games, he was promoted to the first team by manager José Luis Oltra.

Asensio scored his first professional goal on 16 March 2014, netting the first in a 2–0 home win over CD Tenerife. He was made a starter under new coach Valeri Karpin, scoring against CA Osasuna, Deportivo Alavés and UE Llagostera within a month.

Real Madrid
On 24 November 2014, Real Madrid reached an agreement in principle to sign Asensio. On 5 December the deal was officially announced, with the player (who had been a supporter of the club as a child) signing a six-year deal for a €3.9 million fee and remaining with the Bermellones on loan until the end of the campaign. According to Real Madrid president Florentino Pérez, Spanish tennis player Rafael Nadal played a crucial role in the transfer of Marco Asensio to Real Madrid.

2015–16: Loan to Espanyol
On 20 August 2015, after making the whole pre-season with Real Madrid, Asensio was loaned to RCD Espanyol in La Liga. He played his first game in the competition on 19 September, featuring 86 minutes in a 3–2 success at Real Sociedad, and he ended his spell at the Estadi Cornellà-El Prat with 12 overall assists.

2016–17 season: Return to Real Madrid
Returning to the Santiago Bernabéu Stadium for 2016–17, Asensio's first competitive appearance took place on 9 August, as he played the full 120 minutes and scored a 25-meter effort in a 3–2 win against fellow Spaniards Sevilla FC in the UEFA Super Cup. He made his first league start 12 days later, netting the second goal in a 3–0 success at Real Sociedad.

Asensio featured 23 times over his first season, scoring three times as the club won the national championship for the first time since 2012. He added as many goals in that year's UEFA Champions League, including one in the final against Juventus (4–1) to give the Spaniards their 12th title in the latter competition.

2017–18 season
Asensio scored his first goal of the 2017–18 season with a 25-yard finish in a 3–1 win over Barcelona at the Camp Nou, for the Supercopa de España, He repeated the feat with a similarly spectacular effort in the second leg, in a 5–1 aggregate triumph.

On 28 September 2017, Asensio extended his contract until 2023. On 18 February 2018, in a match where he contributed with a brace to a 5–3 away win over Real Betis, he scored Real Madrid's 6,000th goal in the Spanish top division.

Asensio made 11 appearances while scoring one goal during the 2017–18 Champions League, and the club won its third consecutive and 13th overall title in the competition.

2019–present: Injury and redemption
On 24 July 2019, during a preseason match against Arsenal, he tore his ACL. On 19 June 2020, in a 3–0 win over Valencia, he came on for Federico Valverde in 74th minute, scored the second goal with his first touch, and provided the assist to Karim Benzema for the third goal. He returned for the final stretch of the season, scoring three goals in nine games, as Real Madrid won the 2019–20 La Liga.

On 22 September 2021, he scored his first senior hat-trick against his former club Mallorca, which ended in a 6–1 victory. 

On 5th May 2022 Asensio was subbed on at minute 75' by manager Carlo Ancelotti in the UEFA Champions League semi final against Manchester City with the score 4-5 on aggregate Asensio provided the assist to teammate Rodrygo late in the dying minutes to equalise the game.

On 9th May 2022, Asensio was on the bench against Liverpool F.C. in the UEFA Champions League Final as Real Madrid CF went on to win their 14th UCL. Asensio ended the 2021-22 season with 10 goals in 30 Laliga games. He also won the 2021–22 La Liga with his club Real Madrid.

International career 

Being of both Dutch and Spanish descent, he chose to represent Spain although he received invitation from the Royal Dutch Football Association. After being a regular for Spain at youth level, Asensio made his debut for the under-21 team on 26 March 2015, coming on as a late substitute for goalscorer Gerard Deulofeu in a 2–0 friendly win over Norway in Cartagena. In July, he was part of the victorious under-19 side at the UEFA European Championship in Greece, where he scored both goals in a semi-final victory over France in Katerini, in the 88th minute and in added time.

On 17 May 2016, Asensio and Espanyol teammate Pau López were called up to the full side for a friendly against Bosnia and Herzegovina. He made his debut on the 29th, starting in the 3–1 win in Switzerland.

Selected in the squad for the 2017 European Under-21 Championship by manager Albert Celades, Asensio scored a hat-trick in his debut in the competition, helping to a 5–0 group stage routing of Macedonia. He reached with his teammates the final of the tournament, losing 1–0 against Germany.

Back with the seniors, he was included in Julen Lopetegui's squad for the 2018 FIFA World Cup, making his debut in the competition on 20 June by replacing Real Madrid teammate Lucas Vázquez for the final ten minutes of the 1–0 group stage win against Iran.

Asensio scored his first goal for Spain on 11 September 2018, playing the entire 6–0 home rout of Croatia for the UEFA Nations League and also being directly involved in the play that led to Lovre Kalinić's own goal.

In July 2021, he was included as overage player in the 22-player squad of the under-23 team for the 2020 Summer Olympics. 

In November 2022, Asensio was included in the final squad for The World CUp 2022. He started against Costa Rica in the opening fixture of Spain's World cup campaign. He scored the second Goal against Costa Rica which Spain won 7-0

Personal life
Asensio's father, Gilberto (a Basque who spent his childhood in Essen, Germany), was also a footballer. Also an attacking midfielder, he represented Barakaldo CF as a youth; Marco's elder brother Igor played for Platges de Calvià, as a defender.

Asensio's goal celebration in the 2017 Champions League final was dedicated to his family: "I told them that if I scored then I'd run to where they were. I knew where they were and that is what I did."

Career statistics

Club

International

 Spain score listed first, score column indicates score after each Asensio goal.

Honours
Real Madrid
La Liga: 2016–17, 2019–20, 2021–22
Supercopa de España: 2017, 2021–22
UEFA Champions League: 2016–17, 2017–18, 2021–22
UEFA Super Cup: 2016, 2017, 2022
FIFA Club World Cup: 2016, 2017, 2018, 2022

Spain U19
UEFA European Under-19 Championship: 2015

Spain U21
UEFA European Under-21 Championship runner-up: 2017

Spain Olympic
Summer Olympic silver medal: 2020

Individual
Segunda División Player of the Month: October 2014
UEFA European Under-19 Championship Golden Player: 2015
La Liga Breakthrough Player: 2015–16
UEFA European Under-21 Championship Silver Boot: 2017
UEFA European Under-21 Championship Team of the Tournament: 2017
UEFA Champions League Breakthrough XI: 2017

References

External links

Profile at the Real Madrid CF website

1996 births
Living people
Spanish people of Dutch descent
Spanish people of Basque descent
Footballers from Palma de Mallorca
Spanish footballers
Association football midfielders
RCD Mallorca B players
RCD Mallorca players
Real Madrid CF players
RCD Espanyol footballers
Tercera División players
Segunda División players
La Liga players
UEFA Champions League winning players
Spain youth international footballers
Spain under-21 international footballers
Spain international footballers
2018 FIFA World Cup players
2022 FIFA World Cup players
Olympic footballers of Spain
Footballers at the 2020 Summer Olympics
Olympic medalists in football
Olympic silver medalists for Spain
Medalists at the 2020 Summer Olympics